Hartman High School (officially Charles E. Smith High School for Boys)  is an Orthodox Jewish religious high school in Jerusalem.

History
The school, affiliated with the Shalom Hartman Institute, is  located in Jerusalem's German Colony. It has a student population of 350 in grades 7-12. The principal of the High School is Shaul David, and the principal of the Middle School is Channan Zuker.

Hartman describes its educational philosophy as a "dual embrace of tradition and tolerance." It is committed to the State of Israel, community action, and leadership in embracing differences.

A high school for girls, Midrashiya, was established in 2007. Hartman High School also offers a special class for students with autism, Asperger's, and PDD. Volunteerism is part of the curriculum: Students deliver food baskets to needy families and visit senior citizens homes.

See also
Education in Israel

References

External links 
 Official Website
 Hartman Institute Official Website

Schools in Jerusalem